The sixth season of Supernatural, an American dark fantasy television series created by Eric Kripke, premiered September 24, 2010, and concluded May 20, 2011, airing 22 episodes. This is the first season to have Sera Gamble as showrunner after the full-time departure of Kripke. The sixth season had an average viewership of 2.27 million U.S. viewers.

The season begins a year after the happenings of the previous season finale with Dean Winchester (Jensen Ackles) living a happy and normal life. Mysteriously, Sam Winchester (Jared Padalecki) is freed from Lucifer's cage in Hell and teams up with Dean, who leaves his new life behind and becomes a hunter again.  

In the United States the season aired on Fridays at 9:00 pm (ET) on The CW television network. Special guest stars in this season included Brian Doyle-Murray and Robert Englund.

Cast

Starring
 Jared Padalecki as Sam Winchester
 Jensen Ackles as Dean Winchester
 Misha Collins as Castiel

Special guest stars
 Robert Englund as Dr. Robert
 Brian Doyle-Murray as Robert Singer

Guest stars

Episodes

The number in the first column represents the episode's number overall, whereas the number in the second column indicates the episode's number within this particular season (6). "U.S. viewers in millions" refers to how many Americans who watched the episode live or on the day of broadcast.

Production
The show's creator Eric Kripke originally planned for the show to last only five seasons, but due to increased ratings from the fourth and fifth seasons, the CW network renewed the series for a sixth season. Kripke did not return as showrunner; however, he remained a hands-on executive producer, leaving long-time series writer Sera Gamble to take over the day-to-day production of the show. Filming for the season began with the series star Jensen Ackles-directed fourth episode, "Weekend at Bobby's", to give the actor enough time for pre-production. Kripke also wrote the season finale.

Gamble said the sixth season of the show would focus on the brothers' relationship. The season steered towards the format of the early seasons with "lots of meat-and-potatoes closed-ended episodes, and... a season-long story arc to weave in". According to a press release by the CW, Heaven and Hell fell into "complete disarray", forcing Sam and Dean to reunite to "beat back the rising tide of creatures and demon-spawn" that "roam across a lawless and chaotic landscape". The season jumped ahead a year to "get some distance between [Sam and Dean], get some personal history for each of them" to allow for "new conflict, new circumstances, new stuff". The brothers' roles were reversed, with Dean now hesitant to return to the hunting lifestyle. The brothers investigated why monsters have been "acting off-pattern". The first few episodes establish the mythology. An episode spoofing Twilight and other vampire series aired in October 2010 and examined the "current romantic fascination" with vampires. However, the Twilight fans at the center of the Winchesters' "disparaging" comments were "slightly fictionalized". On this, Gamble noted, "...part of the thing is finding a balance between [showing] a poster from the actual show and having Sam and Dean really speak their minds. We don't want to offend." A fan of the Twilight series, she also commented, "I'm certainly not coming at this from a place of feeling superior to them. I have great respect." Another episode of the season, "Clap Your Hands if You Believe", consisted of an "insane" storyline featuring Tinker Bell, and the episode began with an alien abduction and a redone title sequence that is a tribute to The X-Files.

Misha Collins returned as series regular Castiel, and Jim Beaver returned as Bobby Singer for several episodes. Mitch Pileggi made multiple appearances as Sam and Dean's grandfather Samuel. The recurring role of Christian, the maternal cousin of Sam and Dean, was given to Corin Nemec; he was described as "capable, calm under pressure, and very good at his job". Kim Rhodes returned as Sheriff Jody Mills, as did Fredric Lehne as Azazel.

A two-hour season finale aired on May 20, 2011.

Reception
The review aggregator website Rotten Tomatoes reported a 100% approval rating for Supernatural's sixth season, with an average rating of 7.25/10 based on 7 reviews.

Notes

References

External links 

Supernatural 06
2010 American television seasons
2011 American television seasons